Ucambre Jakieron Thembiance Williams (born August 1, 1992) is a Canadian football offensive lineman for the Ottawa Redblacks of the Canadian Football League (CFL). He played college football at University of South Alabama.

College career
Williams played right tackle at University of South Alabama from 2011 to 2014. He played four games in his first season, and redshirted his sophomore year after suffered a season-ending injury in that season's fifth game. In his junior season he was named a second-team All-Sun Belt Conference selection. He was a first-team preseason pick the next year, but missed all of spring practice, recovering from surgery, though became a starter again after missing the first two games.

Professional career

Calgary Stampeders
Williams was picked up by the Stampeders as a tackle in 2016. He played at right guard and, in the 2016 Grey Cup, as right tackle. In 2017, after a string of injuries among the offensive line, he was moved to centre, where coach Dave Dickenson called him a "quick learner". By the end of the season he was named the Stampedes' top offensive lineman, and best offensive lineman nominee for the CFL West Division. He was the starting centre on the team that won the 106th Grey Cup in 2018. He became a free agent upon the expiry of his contract on February 8, 2022.

Ottawa Redblacks
On February 8, 2022, it was announced that Williams had signed with the Ottawa Redblacks. Williams played in 11 games for the Redblacks during the 2022 season. After the season, in late November 2022, Williams posted on Facebook that he had attended a CFL retirement party in his honour: At the time he had not made any official announcement regarding his future  His contract is set to expire in February 2023.

References

External links
Ottawa Redblacks bio

1992 births
Living people
African-American players of Canadian football
Calgary Stampeders players
Canadian football offensive linemen
Ottawa Redblacks players
People from Phenix City, Alabama
Players of American football from Alabama
South Alabama Jaguars football players
21st-century African-American sportspeople